Information Research: An International Electronic Journal is a quarterly peer-reviewed open-access academic journal covering the fields of information science, information management, and information systems. It was established in 1995 as an electronic journal by Thomas D. Wilson (University of Sheffield and University of Borås). It was privately published by Professor Wilson until 2017, when ownership of the journal was transferred to the Swedish School of Library and Information Science, University of Borås.  Professor Wilson continues to act as editor-in-chief. The journal is supported by the University of Lund, which provides server space and technical assistance, and by the University of Borås, which provides administrative support for the deputy editor. The journal is produced entirely through voluntary work; there are no subscription or author charges. A 2012 reader survey revealed that 40% of readers are academic faculty members, 38% "information practitioners", and 22% students and post-graduate researchers.

Abstracting and indexing
The journal is abstracted and indexed in:

According to the Journal Citation Reports, the journal has a 2016 impact factor of 0.574.

References

Further reading

External links
 

Information science journals
Quarterly journals
Publications established in 1995
English-language journals
Lund University